Nevena Vukes (born 2 June 1990) is a Serbian actress.

Biography 
Nevena Ristić was born on June 2, 1990 in Kragujevac, Serbia.
She showed her love for acting as a girl, so she was part of a drama workshop in Kragujevac at the Elementary School, and later at the High School. In addition to acting, she also had interests in scouts and has been a part of the world scout organization since she was 10, with which she visited the beautiful forests and mountains of her country.
Nevena often jokes that she spent more sleepless nights under a tent than in hotels.

As a young girl, during high school, she actively trained hip-hop dance, athletics and later swimming.

At the age of less than 18, Nevena left her hometown to study at the Faculty of Dramatic Arts in Belgrade. From those years, to the present day, professional journeys in the world of acting begin.
As an acting student, in 2011 Nevena got her first leading role in the TV series Lime Blossom in the Balkans, which was broadcast on the national television in Serbia, RTS. Her first presentation to a wider audience resonated positively, and with that role Nevena's active work in the world of film and television began.
Her youthful look with a mature look has become a recognizable stamp of this young actress.

Then began a series of film and television projects.

In 2013 she got a film role outside the borders of her country for the first time in the Macedonian film The Piano Room, and in 2014 he got a role in the Dutch film The Sky Above Us and in the short film Mary's Episode co-produced by Serbia and Canada, and film Lafty and the Man in Black, co-production of Saudi Arabia and Serbia.

In 2014, Nevena also completed a master's degree in acting at the Faculty of Dramatic Arts in Belgrade. As her master's thesis, she performed a project on the theme of the novel The Little Prince by Antoine de Saint-Exupéry. For this project, in which six dancers, a live orchestra and two actors participated, Nevena is signing dramatization, directing and acting.
After the premiere of the play Little Prince, the renowned Boško Buha Children's Theater in Belgrade takes over this play and puts it on its official repertoire.

In the same year, Nevena got the main role in the Croatian TV series Vatre ivanjske. On that occasion, she moved to Zagreb for a year. After the broadcast of this series, Nevena became a recognizable face in the entire Balkans.

In 2015, she founded the traveling theater Teatar Vihor to gather her generation in one place and open a space for theatrical creation of young people. With this traveling theater, she has covered over 60,000 km and 70 cities in five years, and in 2019, the theater also performed in Australia.

Later, she acted in numerous film and television series, of which the drama series We Will Be the World Champions stands out, where she played the main role of a journalist alongside Rade Šerbedžija and Žarko Radić.

In 2017, Nevena married Croatian musician Marko Vukes and moved to Zagreb.

Filmography

Television roles

Movie roles

References

External links

1990 births
Living people
21st-century Serbian actresses
Serbian television actresses
Serbian film actresses
Serbian stage actresses
Actors from Kragujevac
Serbian expatriates in Croatia